Arilla  was a village of ancient Lydia, inhabited during Roman times. The village was allowed to hold an annual seven-day fair in September from the year 134-135 by Titus Aurelius Fulvus Boionius, then governor of Asia.

Its site is located near Hacıhasankıranı in Asiatic Turkey.

References

Populated places in ancient Lydia
Former populated places in Turkey
Roman towns and cities in Turkey
History of Manisa Province